Fyodor Grigoryevich Brovko (Moldovan: Fiodor Brovko; Russian: Фёдор Григо́рьевич Бровко́; 16 May 1904 – 24 January 1960) was a Soviet and Moldavian politician who served as the Chairman of the Presidium of the Supreme Soviet of the Moldavian Soviet Socialist Republic from 1941 to 1951.

Early life and education 
Fyodor Brovko was born to a poor peasant family in the village of Popencu in the Russian Empire on May 16, 1904. He graduated from a Communist Party school in Balta in 1930.

Political career 
Brovko joined the Communist Party of the Soviet Union in 1927. From 1930 to 1937, he worked as the Head of the Department of Propaganda and Agitation for the Dubossary, Kotovsky, and Slobozia District Committees of the Communist Party of Ukraine (Moldavian Autonomous Soviet Socialist Republic). In 1937, he was appointed as the First Secretary of the Slobozia District Committee of the Communist Party of Ukraine of the Moldavian Autonomous Soviet Socialist Republic. From 1938 to 1940, he served as the Deputy Chairman and the Chairman of the Council of People's Commissars of the Moldavian Autonomous Soviet Socialist Republic. On March 1, 1941, Brovko was elected as a member of the Politburo of the Central Committee of the Communist Party of Moldavia. From June 7, 1940, to February 8, 1941, he served as the Chairman of the Supreme Soviet of the Moldavian ASSR. During a purge of party officials in 1951, Brovko was removed from his post. He worked in minor positions in the Moldavian SSR from 1951 to 1958.

He was a member of the Supreme Soviet of the Soviet Union for the 2nd and 3rd convocations.

Death 
Fyodor Brovko died on January 24, 1960, in Chișinău, Moldavian Soviet Socialist Republic, Soviet Union.

Awards 

  Order of Lenin
  Order of the Red Banner
  Order of the Red Banner of Labour

See also 

 Communist Party of Moldavia
 Supreme Soviet of the Moldavian SSR
 Moldavian Autonomous Soviet Socialist Republic

References 

1904 births
1960 deaths
People from Rîbnița District
People from Baltsky Uyezd
Communist Party of the Soviet Union members
Chairmen of the Supreme Soviet of the Moldavian Soviet Socialist Republic
First convocation members of the Soviet of Nationalities
Second convocation members of the Soviet of Nationalities
Third convocation members of the Soviet of the Union
Recipients of the Order of Lenin
Recipients of the Order of the Red Banner
Recipients of the Order of the Red Banner of Labour